Mareham Lane is an unclassified road between Graby and Sleaford in Lincolnshire, England.

The Roman Road
For most of its length Mareham Lane follows the route of a minor Roman road, and the name is also used for that Roman road from Bourne to the original ford at Sleaford and perhaps on to Lincoln (Lindum Colonia).

Margary numbers
Ivan Margary allocated the following Margary numbers in his classification scheme: 
RR260 Bourne-Sleaford
RR262 Sleaford-Bracebridge Heath

Route details

See also
High Dyke, Lincolnshire
King Street (Roman road) Water Newton to Bourne to Ancaster, Margary number RR26

References

External links

Roman Roads in Lincolnshire

Roman roads in England
Archaeological sites in Lincolnshire
History of Lincolnshire
Roads in Lincolnshire